Bow Creek Ecology Park is a small open space along Bow Creek tidal estuary of the River Lea in Canning Town in Newham, in east London. It is operated by the regional Lee Valley Park system.

Description
Bow Creek Ecology Park is a small park running alongside and underneath the Docklands Light Railway near Canning Town Station. The Bow Creek reach of the lower River Lea is a tidal estuary here in Lower Lea Valley.

The park features small streams and ponds, an outdoor classroom, footpaths, observation points, and seating. It is an important resource for local education.

History
The park was created by the London Docklands Development Corporation (LDDC) in 1994, after a survey identified rare and unusual plant species in the area, some presumed carried in by shipping, such as Hairy Buttercup (Ranunculus sardous),  Walthamstow Cress, and Unreel's Wormwood.

The park was officially opened in 1996 by Eastenders actress Michelle Collins for BBC Education programme "Science Zone".

The Park has won a Green Flag Award for the fourth year in 2010, and was also nominated for the UK Landscape Award 2010.

References

External links
Lee Valley Park: Bow Creek Ecology Park website

Lee Valley Park
Parks and open spaces in the London Borough of Newham
River Lea
Canning Town